Speedway is the seventeenth soundtrack album by American singer and musician Elvis Presley, released by RCA Victor in mono and stereo, LPM/LSP 3989, on June 25, 1968. It serves as the soundtrack album for the 1968 film Speedway starring Presley. Recording sessions took place at Metro-Goldwyn-Mayer studios in Hollywood, California, on June 20 and 21, 1967. It peaked at number 82 on the Billboard 200.

Speedway took over the new low for chart position and album sales by Presley, selling fewer than 100,000 copies, and jeopardizing his recording career. Much to his relief, it killed the soundtrack formula, this being the final Presley dramatic feature film to have a full soundtrack album. His last five movies of the decade — Stay Away, Joe, Live A Little, Love A Little, Charro!, The Trouble with Girls, and Change of Habit — concentrated on Presley the actor, not Presley the singer, with minimal song requirements. It is also the last Presley album to be released in both stereo and mono editions as mono was being phased out by the industry, thus making the rare mono pressing of Speedway (LPM-3989) a sought-after item among collectors

Content
Eight tracks for Speedway were recorded at the sessions, with "Suppose", the only song that held interest for Elvis, dropped from the movie. Two tracks were pulled for a single, "Your Time Hasn't Come Yet Baby" with "Let Yourself Go" on its flipside, and both sides made the lower reaches of the Billboard Hot 100 (respectively numbers 72 and 71) but bombed sales-wise. "There Ain't Nothing Like A Song," rejected from the soundtrack for Spinout, was one of two songs that feature the lead vocals of Nancy Sinatra, here in duet with Presley. All her vocals, and her "Your Groovy Self," the only time a track without Elvis featured on any of his releases, were recorded at a separate session on June 26, produced by Lee Hazlewood. Three leftover tracks, including one from the May 1963 "lost album" sessions, were unearthed to round out the album.

Reissues
Three songs from this album appear on Command Performances: The Essential 60s Masters II (1995): the two sides of the single and the title track. In 2016 Speedway was reissued on the Follow That Dream label in a special 2-disc edition that contained the original album tracks along with numerous alternate takes.

Track listing

Personnel

 Elvis Presley −  vocals
 The Jordanaires −  backing vocals
 Charlie McCoy −  trumpet
 Tony Terran −  trumpet
 Boots Randolph −  saxophone
 Pete Drake −  pedal steel guitar
 Tiny Timbrell −  lead guitar
 Chip Young −  electric guitar
 Scotty Moore — rhythm guitar on "Western Union," "Suppose," and "Goin' Home"
 Jerry Kennedy – lead guitar on "Western Union"
 Tommy Tedesco −  lead guitar on "He's Your Uncle, Not Your Dad" and "Let Yourself Go"
 Larry Muhoberac −  piano
 Charlie Hodge −  piano (on "Suppose")
 Bob Moore −  double bass
 D. J. Fontana − drums
 Buddy Harman − drums

June 26 session:
 Nancy Sinatra −  vocals
 Roy Caton −  trumpet
 Virgil Evans −  trumpet
 Oliver Mitchell −  trumpet
 Dick Hyde −  trombone
 Billy Strange −  electric guitar
Donald Owens −  electric guitar
Donnie Lanier −  electric guitar
 Al Casey −  electric guitar
 Larry Knechtel −  piano
 Don Randi −  piano
 Chuck Berghofer −  bass
 Hal Blaine −  drums

Charts

References

External links

LPM-3989 Speedway (monaural) Guide part of The Elvis Presley Record Research Database
LSP-3989 Speedway (stereo) Guide part of The Elvis Presley Record Research Database

1968 soundtrack albums
Elvis Presley soundtracks
RCA Records soundtracks
Musical film soundtracks
Action film soundtracks